Márton György Vámos (born 24 June 1992) is a water polo player of Hungary. He was part of the Hungarian team at the 2015 World Aquatics Championships.

Honours

National
 World Championships:  Gold medal - 2013;  Silver medal - 2017
 European Championship:  Silver medal - 2014;  Bronze medal - 2016
 FINA World League:  Silver medal - 2014; 2018

Club
Vasas

Hungarian Championship : 2011–12
Szolnok

LEN Champions League: 2016–17
LEN Super Cup: 2017
Hungarian Championship: 2014–15, 2015–16, 2016–17 
Hungarian Cup: 2014, 2016
Hungarian Super Cup: 2017 
Ferencváros

LEN Champions League: 2018–19 ; runners-up: 2020–21
LEN Euro Cup: 2017–18
LEN Super Cup: 2018, 2019
Hungarian Championship: 2017–18, 2018–19, 2021–22
Hungarian Cup:  2018, 2019, 2020, 2021
Olympiacos
Greek Cup: 2022–23

Awards
Swimming World Magazine's man water polo  ''World Player of the Year " award: 2017 
Member of the World Team 2017 by total-waterpolo
Fourth Top European Player in the World by LEN: 2019
 Hungarian Water Polo Player of the Year: 2017
 World Championship MVP: 2017 Budapest
2017 World Championship Team of the Tournament
 Hungarian Championship MVP: 2017–18 with Ferencváros
 World League MVP: 2018 Budapest
Youth World Championship MVP: 2011 Volos
 Szalay Iván díj (2010)

See also
 List of world champions in men's water polo
 List of World Aquatics Championships medalists in water polo

References

External links
 

Hungarian male water polo players
Living people
Place of birth missing (living people)
1992 births
World Aquatics Championships medalists in water polo
Water polo players at the 2016 Summer Olympics
Water polo players at the 2020 Summer Olympics
Medalists at the 2020 Summer Olympics
Olympic bronze medalists for Hungary in water polo
21st-century Hungarian people